Zona Central (Central Region) is the historical, administrative, and financial centre of the city of Rio de Janeiro, Brazil. It has been undergoing a major revitalisation since it was rediscovered by locals in the 1990s.

Neighbourhoods 
 Bairro de Fátima
 Castelo
 Centro
 Catumbi
 Cidade Nova
 Estácio
 Gamboa
 Lapa
 Santa Teresa
 Santo Cristo
 Saúde

Transportation 

The city's main train station, Central do Brasil (which provides connections to the SuperVia regional rail system), is located in the Estacio district. The area also contains the terminus for the Santa Teresa Tram at Estação Carioca. Other important modes of transport that connect to Zona Central are:

Rio Metro
VLT (light rail/tram)
Buses

The area also contains the Santos Dumont Airport, one of two major airports in the Rio area.

References 

Neighbourhoods in Rio de Janeiro (city)